Harristown was a borough constituency in the Irish House of Commons until 1800, representing the borough of Harristown in the barony of Naas South, County Kildare.

History
In the Patriot Parliament of 1689 summoned by James II, Harristown was represented with two members.

Members of Parliament, 1684–1801

1689–1801

Notes

References

Bibliography

Constituencies of the Parliament of Ireland (pre-1801)
Historic constituencies in County Kildare
1684 establishments in Ireland
1800 disestablishments in Ireland
Constituencies established in 1684
Constituencies disestablished in 1800